Taish is a 2020 Indian Hindi-language neo-noir action thriller drama film directed by Bejoy Nambiar. The film stars Pulkit Samrat, Jim Sarbh, Harshvardhan Rane, Kriti Kharbanda and Sanjeeda Shaikh. It is produced by Deepak Mukut, Bejoy Nambiar, and Nishant Pitti. The film was released on ZEE5 on 29 October 2020 as a feature film and six episodic series, simultaneously.

Plot 
Rohan Kalra (Jim Sarbh), an Indian General Practitioner lives with his girlfriend Aarfa Khan (Kriti Kharbanda), a Pakistani Orthopaedic Surgeon in the UK. Rohan receives an invitation to attend his brother, Krish's (Ankur Rathee) wedding. This creates a tense situation between Aarfa and Rohan and he has to leave for the wedding by himself. At the wedding, his mother is eager for Rohan to get married as well and forces him to consider some marriage proposals. The atmosphere changes when Sunny Lalwani (Pulkit Samrat), Rohan's best friend, arrives at the wedding. Later that evening, it is revealed that Krish's fiance, Mahi (Zoa Morani), had cheated on him with one of her exes, a month before the wedding. 

Simultaneously, a crime family head, Kuljinder (Abhimanyu Singh), is getting married to Jahaan (Sanjeeda Sheikh) forcibly, who is in love with Kuljinder's younger brother, Pali (Harshvardhan Rane). Pali wants to leave the family and run away with Jahaan. Pali arrives at the venue on the day of the wedding and threatens Kuljinder with a gun. However, Pali gets dragged out of the venue before he could do anything. The marriage infuriates Pali who vows not to kill Kuljinder until Kuljinder fires the first bullet. A few days later, Jahaan escapes home to be with Pali. She later informs him that she's pregnant with his child. Pali decides to run away with Jahaan and start a new life, however, his dreams shatter after Jahaan's sister, Sanober, discovers the truth and forces her to abort.

The two families collide with each other after Sunny comes to know about Rohan's childhood molester is Rohan's father's friend, Kuljinder. Sunny beats Kuljinder badly, paralysing him forever and damaging his vocal cords such that he can't speak. When this gets to Kuljinder's family they blame Pali because of his earlier threat to Kuljinder on his wedding with Jahaan. To prove his innocence, Pali vows to avenge his brother's state resulting in Sunny and Krish getting kidnapped at Krish's wedding where Krish gets killed, and Sunny badly injured. Pali and Sukhi, his best friend, get arrested after Rohan and his family file a case against them. Pali gets jailed, and Rohan moves to somewhere remote after blaming Sunny for Krish's death.

Two years pass by and Rohan is contacted by Sunny's sister who informs him of Sunny's disappearance. It turns out that Sunny is in the same jail as Pali to exact revenge for Krish's death here we learn that one year after Krish's death his fiance Mahi committed suicide leading to Sunny taking this step. Rohan along with Aarfa and Shozi get him out of jail before he committes anything. It is revealed that Kuljinder's business is now run by his wife Sanober and Pali from jail who gets to know of Sunny's plan to kill him. Meanwhile Rohan and Aarfa patch things up and get engaged.

At Rohan's residence he and Aarfa along with Sunny's sister gets attacked by Sukhi who threatens them to tell him about Sunny's location. After back and forth Sunny's sister is held at knife point so Rohan is forced to tell him about Sunny's whereabouts. They later escape and save Sunny. Rohan decided to directly confront Pali and get things over, Pali is shocked to know about Kuljinder's deeds and decides to end the browl but Sunny threatens him to kill his brother Jassi. Later Sunny and Rohan go to a bar where Sunny gets drunk and shots Jassi. Watching his brothers dead body Pali swears revenge and plans to get out of jail to staging an injury. He escapes on the way to hospital and along with Sukhi goes to his home where he asks Jahan to run away with him.

The final episode ends with a chase sequence between Sunny- Rohan and Pali- Sukhi. This results in Pali getting in an accident where Sukhi is killed. Then Sunny asking with Rohan fight Pali who is weak due to his injuries from the accident. They manage to bring him down but Sunny is shot in the sequence and he later dies. The series ends with a clip of Jahan waiting for Pali at an airport.

Cast 
 Harshvardhan Rane as Pali Brar
 Pulkit Samrat as Sunny Lalwani
 Kriti Kharbanda as Aarfa Khan, Rohan's love interest 
 Jim Sarbh as Rohan Kalra, Sunny's childhood friend
 Ankur Rathee as Krish Kalra, Rohan's brother
 Zoa Morani as Mahi, Krish's fiance
 Sanjeeda Sheikh as Jahaan Brar, Pali's love interest, Sanober's sister
 Melissa Raju Thomas as Simmi, Sunny's love interest (cameo appearance)
 Saurabh Sachdeva as Sukhi
 Abhimanyu Singh as Kuljinder "Kulli" Brar, Pali and Jassi's brother;  
 Viraf Patel as Shozi
 Armaan Khera as Jassi Brar, Pali's brother 
 Saloni Batra as Sanober Brar, Kulli's wife
 Kunika as Beeji
 Ikhlaque Khan as Rohan's father
 Mohnisha Haseen as Rohan's mother
 Mahavir Bhullar as Gyaan ji
 Shivanshu Pandey as Ismail
 Ekansh Kumar Sharma as Sattu

Soundtrack 

The film's music was composed by Raghav Sachar, Prashant Pillai, Govind Vasantha, Enbee and Gaurav Godkhindi, while lyrics were written by Rohit Sharma, Hussain Haidry, Armaan Khera and Enbee.

Critical Reception 
Anna MM Vetticad from Firstpost rated Taish 3.25 out of 5 and stated "Taish the series is fair enough, but it is the film that manages to effectively convey the wrath and passion of the title, making it Nambiar’s best work yet". Shubhra Gupta from The Indian Express wrote "The web series goes back and forth in time, and then leaps to the present, leading to some amount of confusion. And then there is Nambiar’s old nemesis, the lack of substance which you end up missing in all the style".

Pallabi Dey Purkayastha from The Times Of India wrote " Taish is timely, stylish and has an important life lesson to impart – that revenge is never the answer and rage triggers rage – but the execution and storytelling technique should have been much tighter, and with a climax that would have taken the viewers by total surprise".

Adithya Narayan Taish from The Hindu reviewed "Taish’s failure lies in its inability to exploit one of the luxuries afforded by the medium: scope for character development. Scroll.in stated  Taish always looks poised to say something deep and memorable about the need to process old wounds and think before you act. It’s often loud and unwieldy, but it’s flashy and good-looking too in its own way".

References

External links 
 
 
 Taish on ZEE5
 Taish on ZEE5

2020s Hindi-language films
Indian films about revenge
ZEE5 original films
2020 thriller drama films
Indian thriller drama films
Films directed by Bejoy Nambiar